Johan Christiaan Kriek (born April 5, 1958) is a South African-American retired tennis player and founder of the Global Water Foundation, a non-profit organization dedicated to delivering clean water to the world's neediest communities. He won two Australian Open titles and reached the semifinals at the French Open and US Open, as well as the quarterfinals of Wimbledon. Kriek won 14 professional singles and eight doubles titles, reaching a career-high singles ranking of world No. 7 in September 1984.

He attended Afrikaanse Hoër Seunskool (Afrikaans High School for Boys, also known as Affies), a public school located in Pretoria.

Kriek became a naturalized American citizen in August 1982. He currently resides in Palm Beach Gardens, Florida with his wife, Daga and their children Karolina and Kristian.

Grand Slam finals

Singles: (2 titles)

Career finals

Singles (14 titles, 13 runner-ups)

Doubles (8 titles, 7 runner-ups)

Grand Slam singles performance timeline

References

External links
 
 
 Global Water Foundation
 bio - file interview with John Kriek

1958 births
Afrikaner people
American male tennis players
American people of Afrikaner descent
Grand Slam (tennis) champions in men's singles
Living people
Naturalized citizens of the United States
People from uPhongolo Local Municipality
South African emigrants to the United States
South African male tennis players
South African people of Dutch descent
Sportspeople from Naples, Florida
Sportspeople from Roanoke, Virginia
Tennis people from Florida
Australian Open (tennis) champions